Ricerche di Pedagogia e Didattica: Journal of Theories and Research in Education is a peer-reviewed open access academic journal established in 2006. It is published by the Department of Education science of the University of Bologna. It covers education theories and pedagogy. The journal is published in Italian and English.

In 2012, the journal acquired class A status in the evaluation lists published by the "National Agency for the Evaluation of Universities and Research Institutes", and it is indexed in several databases (as SUMMONS) and academic search engines

It is maintained by AlmaDL, digital library of the University of Bologna.

References

External links 
 

Education journals
Creative Commons Attribution-licensed journals
Publications established in 2006
Biannual journals
Multilingual journals
University of Bologna